Ashley Sharp (born 11 June 1997) is an Australian rules footballer who played for the Fremantle Football Club in the AFL Women's competition. Sharp was drafted by Fremantle with their third selection and twentieth overall in the 2016 AFL Women's draft. After the round three match against , in which she recorded nine disposals and three goals, she was announced as the round nominee for the AFL Women's Rising Star. She played every match in her debut season to finish with seven matches.

In December 2022, Sharp decided to step away from football to focus on her family.

Off the field, Sharp plays in the State Basketball League, having played for the East Perth Eagles in 2016 and 2017 before joining the Kalamunda Eastern Suns in 2018.

References

External links 

1997 births
Living people
Australian rules footballers from Western Australia
Australian women's basketball players
Fremantle Football Club (AFLW) players